Ngabu Yannick Bapupa (born 21 January 1982) is a Congolese former professional footballer who played as a midfielder. He won five caps with the DR Congo national team.

Club career
In April 2010, Bapupa was sentenced to serve two years in prison for a rape he committed during autumn 2009 in Sweden when celebrating the newly signed contract with Kalmar FF. On 7 June 2011, Bapupa had served two thirds of the time and was conditionally released.

International career
Bapupa earned his first cap for DR Congo national football team against Gabon on 25 March 2008.

Honours

Club
Djurgårdens IF
 Allsvenskan (2): 2002, 2003
 Svenska Cupen (2): 2002, 2004

References

External links
 
 Svenskfotboll profile 

1982 births
Living people
Footballers from Kinshasa
Association football midfielders
Democratic Republic of the Congo footballers
Democratic Republic of the Congo international footballers
Democratic Republic of the Congo expatriate footballers
Democratic Republic of the Congo expatriate sportspeople in Sweden
Expatriate footballers in Sweden
Åtvidabergs FF players
Djurgårdens IF Fotboll players
Gefle IF players
Kalmar FF players
AFC Eskilstuna players
Allsvenskan players